Tollywood Focus is a 2008 Bengali film Directed by Manas Basu.

Plot
It is another peek at what goes on behind the glitz and glamour of Tollywood. Swastika plays an actress in a live-in relationship with her director (Amitabha). But the mysterious death of Swastika's husband keeps haunting her. Satyabrato a boy from Hedua(North Calcutta) started nourishing a dream. His father got astonished hearing such a dream from a lower-middle-class family chap. People of their class dream to be a Cost Accountant or sometimes even to be a Pilot but become a B.D.O. (Block Development Officer) at the end. But this boy have gone mad. He wants to be a hero, and in cinemas. Yes Cinemas, that's the most horrid part. If it was serial then there would have been a chance because they need people as because they are never ending. But Satyabrato stood apart. He started exercising physically and mentally. After many days he got in touch with a renowned director, a master craftsman regarding making Thrillers and Murder mysteries- Anirban Choudhury- Everything was going, OK for Satyabrato except his girlfriend who was not at all ready to hear all those bull shit and wanted him to give the SSC exams if he was at all ready to leave his present job. Glitter and glam was a part of life for Ananya. She loved and cherished these as she cherished looks of guys who wanted to be close to her. God gave her all these to hide her past life where she had a torrid experience with a man she loved. Though the man have passed, a scar remained in the minds of the NO 1 heroin. Her beloved husband was a talented director, who had even received a national award at a very young age. But suddenly Anirban came in the life of Ananya. Anirban a very shrude fellow, became very close to Ananya and slowly but surely webbed the heroin with his cunning brain. He poisoned her and insisted Ananya to kill Dipankar... Ananya liked Satyo for his innocence. A softness grew up and one fine evening, a bit drunk with nostalgia she disclosed the hidden truth to Satyo. And SATYO came out to be the one, nobody thought of. A reporter of a reputed News Channel, with a hidden camera.

Cast
Swastika Mukherjee,
Anirban Das,
Amitabha Bhattacharya,
Indrajit (Guest appearance),
Gourishankar Panda,
Anindya Banerjee,
Sayantani

Crew
 Producer(s): Koushik Ghosh
 Director: Manas Basu
Story:Manas Basu
Production Design:
Dialogue: Kaushik Pal
Lyrics: Deb Chowdhury
Editing : 
Cinematography: Manosh Ganguly

Music
Deb Choudhury

References

External links
gomolo.in
www.calcuttatube.com

2008 films
Bengali-language Indian films
2000s Bengali-language films